An amorphism, in chemistry, crystallography and, by extension, to other areas of the natural sciences is a substance or feature that lacks an ordered form. In the specific case of crystallography, an amorphic material is one that lacks long range (significant) crystalline order at the molecular level. In the history of chemistry, amorphism was recognised even before the discovery of the nature of the exact atomic crystalline lattice structure. The concept of amorphism can also be found in the fields of art, biology, archaeology and philosophy as a characterisation of objects without form, or with random or unstructured form.

See also 
 Glass
 Obsidian

References

Bibliography 
 
 
 

Crystallography
Physical chemistry